In firearms operating systems, the term roller locked refers to locking the bolt with rollers. Notable examples of firearms using this method are the MG 42 general-purpose machine gun, and the CZ 52 semi-automatic pistol. It was also applied in the experimental Gerät 03 semi-automatic rifle and Gerät 06 and EM-1 experimental assault rifles.
The MG 42's lineage continued past World War II, forming the basis for the nearly identical MG1 (MG 42/59), chambered in 7.62×51mm NATO, which subsequently evolved into the MG1A3, and later the Bundeswehr's MG 3, Italian MG 42/59 and Austrian MG 74. It also spawned the Yugoslav unlicensed nearly identical Zastava M53.

History
Origin of the roller-locking is debated: even though the general principle of utilizing "ball bearing parts" under radial pressure "for preventing uncoupling of the coupling members" was known no later than 1910s, it was apparently not used in firearms until 1930s.

Mechanism

In roller locked arms in the locked position during firing the rollers rest on parallel surfaces relative to the bore axis on the bolt head, so no amount of force pushing back on the bolt can cause the bolt to unlock. When chambering a fresh cartridge the bolt head is used to push out the rollers. For that the bolt head ends in an angled/oblique wedge to smoothly move the rollers outwards into their lockup position.

Roller locking is used by the CZ 52 pistol. Slide, barrel, locking piece and rollers are shown here.

Normally the recoil spring pushes the locking piece rearward, which in turn pushes the barrel back and holds the locking rollers. (In some of these pictures the spring is removed)

When the gun is fired, the barrel, slide and locking piece (right side of picture) will move backwards a short distance, while the locking piece will be stopped by a tab on the frame, shown on the left with a stick pointing out the mating surface.

With the locking piece stopped by the tab, the rollers will continue rearward with the slide, until they reach the recessed portion of the locking piece. The rollers will then be allowed to move inward, and will release from their indentations in the slide releasing the slide from the barrel.

At about the same time, the barrel will be stopped by the locking piece. Momentum will carry the slide back against the pressure of the recoil spring where extraction and feeding a fresh cartridge happen similarly to other designs.

As the slide moves forward, the locking piece maintains outward pressure on the rollers. When the recesses in the slide are positioned with the rollers, the locking piece will push them out into the recesses and move forward, locking the barrel to the slide again, the barrel and slide will move forward a small amount and stop. Unlike a standard Browning short-recoil action, there is no tipping of the barrel during operation.

Other locking systems with similarities
 Roller-delayed blowback as in the HK G3, where similar rollers are used is sometimes mistakenly called roller locked, but there is no genuine locking of the bolt and no recoiling of the barrel in delayed blowback action as the rollers rest on angled/oblique surfaces, so applying a backwards force on the bolt will cause it to unlock.
 The flapper locking method and roller locking are similar in concept.
 The ball bearing roller locking system used in straight-pull rifles like the Anschütz 1827 Fortner, Crossfire MK1, Heym SR 30 and Savage Impulse, 
 The collet locking system used in the Blaser R8/R93/Blaser Tactical and Thompson .30-06 prototype which uses an expanding collet in a similar fashion.

See also
 Rotating bolt
 Interrupted screw

References

External links
 How Does It Work: Roller Locking Forgotten Weapons

Firearm actions